Édika is the pen name of Édouard Karali (born 17 December 1940 in Heliopolis, Egypt), a French comics artist, who is renowned for his distinctively absurd style. A number of his comic strips have been translated into several European languages such as; English (published by Knockabout Comics), Spanish, Italian (in the magazine Totem comic), German (published by Alpha Comics), Swedish (published by Epix), Danish (published by Runepress) and Greek (in the magazines Babel and Para Pente).

Biography
Initially working for the advertising industry in Egypt, he moved to France where his works were published in the Franco-Belgian comics magazines Pilote, Charlie Mensuel, and Psikopat, the magazine of his brother Paul Carali. A major milestone in his career as a comics artist was his cooperation with Gotlib, becoming a main contributor to the comics magazine Fluide Glacial.

Style
A typical Édika comics episode involves a plot structured in a complex and often inconsequential fashion, filled with verbose dialogues and a lot of meta-references. Most of those episodes don't have an ending.

Recurring characters are Bronski Proko and sometimes his family: wife Olga, kids Paganini (or just Nini) and Georges, and a non-speaking cat with an otherwise human behaviour, named Clarke Gaybeul (deliberately homophone to Clark Gable).

References

 Edika publications in Fluide Glacial and Pilote – BDoubliées 
 Edika albums – Bedetheque 
Footnotes

External links
 Edika biography on Lambiek Comiclopedia
 Edika : fluide glacial sur la BD 

1940 births
French cartoonists
French comics artists
French comics writers
French comics
Living people
French male writers
Egyptian cartoonists
Egyptian comics artists